The 2015 Katsina State gubernatorial election was the 6th gubernatorial election of Katsina State. Held on 11 April 2015, the All Progressives Congress nominee Aminu Bello Masari won the election, defeating Musa Nashuni of the People's Democratic Party.

APC primary
APC candidate, Aminu Bello Masari clinched the party ticket. The APC primary election was held in 2014.

PDP primary
PDP candidate, Musa Nashuni clinched the party ticket. The PDP primary election was held in 2014.

Results 
A total of 7 candidates contested in the election. Aminu Bello Masari from the All Progressives Congress won the election, defeating Musa Nashuni from the People's Democratic Party.

References 

Katsina State gubernatorial elections
Katsina gubernatorial
April 2015 events in Nigeria